Rai Bhoe Bhatti (c. 1380 - 1454 or 1461), alternatively spelt as Rai Bhoi Bhatti, was a Rajput landlord in medieval India. He was the founder of a rebuilt Nankana Sahib, formerly known as Rai-Bhoi-Di-Talwandi, a village in the province of Punjab (an 'iqtas [province] of the ruling Delhi Sultanate). He was born a Hindu but embraced Islam later on in his life. He was the son of Rai Raaney Bhatti.

Ancestors of Bhatti arrived in Punjab in the early 14th century during the reign of Alauddin Khalji (1295-1315). Khalji's Army had attacked Jaisalmer, a state in Rajputana(now Rajasthan in India), to avenge raids by Hindu Rajputs. After a bloody battle, one of the Bhatti Rajput prince along with his clansmen who survived were taken hostage. They were sent to exile in northern Punjab, near Kotli (about 40 miles from the present-day Lahore). According to the legend, Khalji was so touched by their bravery that he paid a tribute to them by giving them about 1,50,000 acres of Punjab's most fertile land as compensation for their defeat and also as an enticement to keep them from rallying troops and building a new Rajput Bhatti Army. 

Bhoe Bhatti supervised the rebuilding of the village of Talwandi after it had been destroyed during the numerous invasions of the Punjab (and wider subcontinent) by invaders such as Timur. During his tenureship as the village's chief or zamindar, the village successfully grew in population through developments supervised by Rai Bhoe and also the assured security from foreign invasions. 

Bhatti had a son named Rai Bular Bhatti, born in circa 1425 (according to records kept by bards) or 1430, who would succeed him as the local zamindar. Bular Bhatti would later gain recognition for being the employer of Mehta Kalu, the father of Guru Nanak, the founder of Sikhism.

References

14th-century Indian people